Airlie Ogilvie (born 28 September 1987) is an Australian field hockey player.
She is married to Simon Orchard, formerly of the Kookaburras.

References

1987 births
Living people
Australian female field hockey players
21st-century Australian women